Frédéric Bolley (born 17 February 1974 in Marseille) is a French former professional motocross racer. He competed in the Motocross World Championships from 1997 to 2002. Bolley is notable for being a two-time 250cc motocross world champion.

Bolley won consecutive F.I.M. 250cc motocross world championships in 1999 and 2000  riding for the Honda factory racing team. 

In 2002, Bolley announced his retirement from motocross to follow Jean-Michel Bayle by switching to road racing. He later competed in the supermoto world championships as well as indoor enduro competitions.

References 

1974 births
Living people
Sportspeople from Marseille
French motocross riders
Enduro riders